Clickbait is a drama miniseries, created by Tony Ayres and Christian White. Ayres serves as showrunner, while Brad Anderson, Emma Freeman, Ben Young, and Laura Besley are directors. It was released on Netflix on August 25, 2021.

Overview
Clickbait explores the dark side of social media. In one thread of the story, a father goes missing, only to appear in a viral video holding a sign saying that he will die if the video receives 5 million views.

The series is set in Oakland, California, but was mostly filmed in Melbourne, Australia.

Cast

Main

 Zoe Kazan as Pia Brewer, Nick’s younger sister
 Betty Gabriel as Sophie Brewer, Nick’s wife
 Phoenix Raei as Roshan Amiri, an Oakland Police Department detective 
 Abraham Lim as Ben Park, a ruthless reporter and associate producer for GBZ Online who follows Nick's case and is determined to interview the family
 Adrian Grenier as Nick Brewer, a family man who went missing after a video of him holding a sign that says: "I ABUSE WOMEN", then a second sign that says: "AT 5 MILLION VIEWS I DIE" went viral online and he failed to show up to work that morning
 Motell G Foster as Curtis Hamilton, a former colleague of Sophie's with whom she had an affair
 Jessie Collins as Emma Beesly, a woman who claimed to be Nick's mistress

Recurring

 Camaron Engels as Ethan Brewer, Sophie and Nick's older son
 Jaylin Fletcher as Kai Brewer, Sophie and Nick's younger son
 Liz Alexander as Andrea Brewer, Pia and Nick's mother
 Becca Lish as Dawn Gleed, the administration manager at the Merritt Sports Performance Center
 Wally Dunn as Ed Gleed, Dawn's husband
 Ian Meadows as Matt Aldin, Nick's best friend and colleague at the Merritt Sports Performance Center
 Steve Mouzakis as Det. Zach De Luca
 Jack Walton as Vince, a patient of Pia who helps her find out what happened to Nick
 Kate Lister as Jeannine Murphy
 Adel Della Massa as Paula
 Emily Goddard as Linda, the administration coordinator at the Merritt Sports Performance Center
 Mia Challis as Jenny
 Ezra Bix as Det. Josephson 
 Salme Geransar as Det. Majano
 Dean Cartmel as Det. Feldman
 Jake Unsworth as Colin Howard
 Akosia Sabet as Bailey Quinn
 Renee Lim as Alice, Sophie's friend who is also her attorney
 Alexis Watt as Jessica Centeno

Guest
 Daniel Henshall as Simon Burton, the brother of a woman named Sarah Burton who committed suicide after Jeremy Wilkerson (one of Nick's alleged dating profile pseudonyms) told her to kill herself

Episodes

Production
In August 2019, it was announced Netflix would produce an 8-episode series created and produced by Tony Ayres and Christian White, with David Heyman serving as producer under his Heyday Television banner, with Brad Anderson set as lead director. In December 2019, Zoe Kazan, Betty Gabriel, Adrian Grenier and Phoenix Raei joined the cast. In February 2020, Abraham Lim, Jessie Collins, Ian Meadows, Daniel Henshall, Motell Foster, Jaylin Fletcher and Cameron Engels joined the cast. Principal photography began in December 2019. Production on the series was suspended in March 2020 due to the COVID-19 pandemic. In November 2020, the series resumed filming in Melbourne. Clickbait was released on Netflix on August 25, 2021.

Reception

Critical reception
The review aggregator website Rotten Tomatoes reports a 58% approval rating with an average rating of 6.3/10, based on 31 critic reviews. The website's critics consensus reads, "With an array of flashy, half-formed ideas and thin characterizations, Clickbait is more akin to its namesake than the deeper show it aspires to be." Metacritic, which uses a weighted average, assigned a score of 48 out of 100 based on 12 critics, indicating "mixed or average reviews".

Roxana Hadadi writing for RogerEbert.com wrote "Clickbait is a reminder of why Netflix series became such hits in the first place. A cast of recognizable, serviceable actors dive with melodrama and zeal into a narrative that defies logical sense but moves at a breakneck pace, ends on cliffhangers like clockwork, and incorporates just enough zigs and zags to keep viewers guessing."

Adam Sweeting at The Arts Desk described the series as a "fiendishly cunning thriller" and concluded that "the way Ayres and White handle their final-reel reveal is a masterclass in advanced whodunnitry. They even helpfully lob in a subsidiary could-be villain as a decoy. We are left to ponder whether Clickbait is itself clickbait."

Saloni Gajjar writing for The A.V. Club criticized the show for its "ridiculous bait-and-switch twists and red herrings, offering very little else."

James Croot writing for www.stuff.co.nz wrote that "as a police procedural and heart-stopping horror, it is aces, evoking memories of David Fincher’s finest (Seven, Panic Room), ratcheting up the stakes as the video’s ticker goes into overdrive."

Viewership
Between August 23 and September 12, 2021, Clickbait was the most-viewed original streaming title in the US for three consecutive weeks according to Nielsen Holdings

Clickbait was the most viewed series on Netflix in the United States in September 2021, and the fourth biggest show globally.

Clickbait was the most viewed series on Netflix in the UK in August  and September 2021.

The Sydney Morning Herald reported that Clickbait hit the No.1 spot on Netflix in more than 20 countries.

References

External links

2021 American television series debuts
2021 American television series endings
2021 Australian television series debuts
2021 Australian television series endings
2020s American drama television miniseries
2020s Australian television miniseries
English-language Netflix original programming
Kidnapping in television
Television series about families
Television series about social media
Television series by Matchbox Pictures
Television series by Universal Television
Television series created by Tony Ayres
Television shows filmed in Australia
Television shows set in Oakland, California
Television productions suspended due to the COVID-19 pandemic